Hendrich Miller Meireles Bernardo or simply Hendrich (born March 2, 1986 in Natal), is a Brazilian attacking midfielder. He currently plays for Sport Club Santa Cruz.

Contract
CRB (Loan) 5 January 2008 to 30 November 2008
Atlético Mineiro 2 January 2008 to 31 December 2009
Guarany de Sobral-CE 2011

External links
sambafoot
CBF

1986 births
Living people
Brazilian footballers
Clube Atlético Mineiro players
Clube de Regatas Brasil players
Association football midfielders
People from Natal, Rio Grande do Norte
Sportspeople from Rio Grande do Norte